Risen Christ is an oil on canvas painting by Guido Reni, from 1620.

Description
The painting is an oil on canvas with dimensions of 228 x 138 centimeters. It is in the collection of MUŻA in Valletta, Malta.

Analysis
It is inspired by a statue made by Michelangelo Buonarroti, at the church of Santa Maria Sopra Minerva in Rome.

References

See also
Risen Christ (Michelangelo)

1620 paintings
Paintings in Malta
Paintings by Guido Reni
Paintings depicting Jesus